Coryphellidae is a taxonomic family of brightly coloured nudibranchs.

Genera
, genera within the family Coryphellidae include:

Gallery

References

Coryphellidae
Gastropod families